Robert Pesquet (9 April 1917 – 11 December 2010) was a French politician.

Pesquet was born in Kenitra, Morocco (then called Port-Lyautey). He represented the National Centre of Social Republicans in the National Assembly from 1956 to 1958.

In 1959, Pesquet was imprisoned for his role in activities on behalf of the Organisation armée secrète and he was also implicated in a failed assassination attempt against François Mitterrand, which became known as the Observatory Affair. Having fled to Portugal, he secretly returned, pretending to be a carpenter.

In 2003, he attempted a political comeback at the age of 86.

References

1917 births
2010 deaths
People from Kenitra
Rally of the French People politicians
National Centre of Social Republicans politicians
National Republican Movement politicians
Deputies of the 3rd National Assembly of the French Fourth Republic
Members of the Organisation armée secrète
French expatriates in Morocco